The 1945 Rice Owls football team was an American football team that represented Rice University as a member of the Southwest Conference (SWC) during the 1945 college football season. In its sixth season under head coach Jess Neely, the team compiled a 5–6 record (3–3 against SWC opponents) and was outscored by a total of 153 to 130.

Schedule

References

Rice
Rice Owls football seasons
Rice Owls football